The 2021 Rzeszów Presidential Elections – were announced after the incumbent President Tadeusz Ferenc resigned, which happen on 10 February 2021. The election commissioner in Rzeszów, through a decision on February 17, 2021, declared the mandate of the city's president to expire.

Polish Prime Minister Mateusz Morawiecki by order on 14 March 2021, ordered the election date to be 9 May 2021. The Election date has been moved to June 13, 2021.

Electoral committees
According to the election calendar, until March 30, 2021, the election commissioner will receive notices about the establishment of electoral committees intending to nominate candidates for the mayor of the city.

The following committees have been registered:
 KWW Ewy Leniart Wspólny Dom Rzeszów
 KWW Grzegorz Braun – Konfederacja
 KWW Konrada Fijołka „Rozwój Rzeszowa 2.0”
 KWW Rzeszów Przyszłości
 KW Marcin Warchoł Tadeusz Ferenc – Dla Rzeszowa
 KWW Waldemar Kotula – Porozumienie dla Rzeszowa
 KW Polska 2050
 KW Hejt Stop
 KWW Kazimierza Rocheckiego „Z-C-Z Rzeszów”
 KWW Trybuna Miasta Rzeszowa
 KWW Artura Głowackiego
 KW Normalny Kraj
 KWW Dobry Wybór dla Rzeszowa

Candidates
According to the election calendar, until April 16, 2021, the city election commission will be accepting applications for the President of the city. Each committee will be able to register one candidate.

On the day of Tadeusz Ferenc's resignation, Marcin Warchoł, Deputy Minister of Justice from United Poland, announced his run in the elections, who received the support of the outgoing president.

On 22 February 2021, the local branches of the Polish People's Party announced the run of the president of one of the Rzeszów housing cooperatives, Edward Słupek.

On February 23, 2021, Jarosław Gowin's Agreement announced that they would run for the elections. The party's candidate was city councilor Waldemar Kotula, who won in the party primaries in March 2021 with the second candidate, vice-president of the Polish Tourist Organization, Arkadiusz Opoń.

On March 4, 2021, Confederation announced that its candidate would be MP Grzegorz Braun, who in 2019 ran unsuccessfully in the early elections for the president of Gdańsk.

On March 10, 2021, Law and Justice recommended the candidacy of Ewa Leniart, the voivode of the Subcarpathian Voivodeship

On March 15, 2021, Konrad Fijołek, the deputy chairman of the City Council in Rzeszów and the head of the Rzeszów development club, officially presented his candidacy in the elections. He will run from his own election committee, with the support of the Civic Coalition, the Polish People's Party, the Left and Poland 2050

Waldemar Kotula dropped out from the election and endorsed Marcin Warchoł, United Poland's candidate and Ferenc's picked successor.

Result
The election was won in the first round by the United opposition candidate Konrad Fijołek, a former councillor from Tadeusz Ferenc’s Electoral Committee. In second place came Ewa Leniart, the Law and Justice candidate and Voivode of the Subcarpathian Voivodship.

References

Local elections in Poland
2021 in Poland
Rzeszów